Lake Superior State Park is a  state park located on a small lake, Lake Superior, in the Town of Bethel in Sullivan County, New York.  The park is operated by the Sullivan County Department of Public Works under a long-term license from the Palisades Interstate Park Commission.

Park description
Lake Superior State Park offers picnic tables, volleyball courts, and a food concession. A swimming beach is open on weekends and holidays from Memorial Day until late June, with daily swimming available from the last week of June through Labor Day. A boat launch is available for boats, however gas-powered motors are not permitted.

Big game hunting, fishing and ice fishing is permitted within season for individuals possessing valid hunting and fishing licenses.

See also
 List of New York state parks

References

External links
 New York State Parks: Lake Superior State Park
 Sullivan County Department of Public Works: Lake Superior State Park

Palisades Interstate Park system
Parks in Sullivan County, New York
State parks of New York (state)